The Monobloc chair is a lightweight stackable polypropylene chair, usually white in colour, often described as the world's most common plastic chair. The name comes from mono- ("one") and bloc ("block"), meaning an object forged in a single piece.

History 
Based on original designs by the Canadian designer D.C. Simpson in 1946, variants of the one-piece plastic chair went into production with Allibert Group and Grosfillex Group in the 1970s. Other sources name the French engineer Henry Massonnet from Nurieux-Volognat with his "Fauteuil 300" from 1972 as the inventor of the monobloc. They were inspired by the Chair Universal 4867 design by Joe Colombo in 1965, but no patents were filed for a monobloc chair design. Since then, millions have been manufactured in countries including Russia, Taiwan, Australia, Mexico, the United States, Italy, France, Germany, Morocco, Turkey, Israel, India and China.

Production 
The Monobloc chair is named because it is injection moulded from thermoplastic as one piece rather than being assembled from multiple pieces. Many variations and styles exist but all are designed to allow the chair to be made quickly and cheaply through injection molding. A common thermoplastic used is thermoplastic polypropylene, with the granules being heated to about 220 degrees Celsius, and the melt injected into a mold. The gate of the mould is usually located in the seat, ensuring smooth flow to all parts of the tool.

Close to a billion Monoblocs have been sold in Europe alone, with one Italian manufacturer producing over ten million a year. Many design variants of the basic idea exist. The chairs cost approximately $3.50 to produce, making them affordable across the world. The stackable design aids setting up large gatherings and storage of the chairs afterwards. Monobloc plastic chairs are prevalent in outdoor usage as design features like slits on seat and backrest let rain water and wind pass through and wide base makes it hard to tip over.

Social reception 
The monobloc chair has been a controversial piece of furniture. Many people, including social theorist Ethan Zuckerman, have described the chair as having achieved a cultural global ubiquity. This global ubiquity has been seen as both a positive and a negative, with some considering the homogenous nature of the chair "disturbing" and "the real evil of globalization", while others have called it one of "the world's most perfectly designed object[s]".

Monobloc plastic chairs were briefly banned from public spaces in the city of Basel, Switzerland from 2008 to 2017 to preserve the beauty of cityscape.

Exhibitions 
 2017: Monobloc. A chair for the world at the Vitra Design Museum in Weil am Rhein.
 2018: Honor Cheap Furniture by Martí Guixé at Galleria Nazionale d'Arte Moderna in Rome.

Gallery

References

External links 

Designboom - History of the Monobloc
Plastikstuhl - Blog dedicated to Monobloc Chairs
Plasticchair.org – Blog aiming to gather a Monobloc plastic chair picture from every country 
Chair, Misunderstood: Learning to love a viral piece of furniture. - Podcast discussing history of the Monobloc by Gimlet Media

Chairs
Individual models of furniture
Stacking chairs